Lee Ji-young may refer to:

 Lee Ji-young (field hockey) (born 1971), South Korean former field hockey player
 Lee Jee-young (born 1981), South Korean golfer
 JeeYoung Lee (born 1983), South Korean artist
 Lee Ji-young (baseball) (born 1986), South Korean baseball player
 Lee Ji-young (swimmer) (born 1989), South Korean swimmer
 Rhee Ji-yeong (fl. 2000s), South Korean voice actress